Peter Wilk is an American baseball coach and former player. He played college baseball at Rollins College for Boyd Coffie from 1984 to 1987. He then served as the head coach of the Georgetown Hoyas (2000–2020). He is the current manager for the Vermont Lake Monsters of the Futures Collegiate Baseball League.

Playing career
Wilk played college baseball for the Rollins Tars. Following his career at Rollins, Wilk played semi-professional baseball.

Coaching career
Wilk coached at Boston University as an assistant in 1990 and 1991. In 1992, Wilk joined the Harvard Crimson baseball program as an assistant. Wilk was named the Acton-Boxborough Regional High School head baseball coach. In the fall of 1996, Wilk was named an assistant at Georgetown University. He was named the head coach when Kirk Mason resigned in 1999.

On September 9, 2009, Wilk and the Hoyas were penalized by the NCAA for misusing the work study program which allowed players to receive money for jobs they were not doing.

On May 20, 2015, the Hoyas qualified for the Big East baseball tournament for the first time since 1986. The Hoyas went 0–2 in their return to the postseason. On July 29, 2020, Wilk resigned as the head coach of the Hoyas.

On April 12, 2021, Wilk signed with the Vermont Lake Monsters of the Futures Collegiate Baseball League and would serve as their manager.

Head coaching record

References

External links
Pete Wilk at The Baseball Cube
 Georgetown Hoyas bio

Living people
Rollins Tars baseball players
Boston University Terriers baseball coaches
Harvard Crimson baseball coaches
High school baseball coaches in the United States
Georgetown Hoyas baseball coaches
People from Barrington, Rhode Island
Year of birth missing (living people)